CLRA may refer to:

 California Consumers Legal Remedies Act
Congress of Local and Regional Authorities
 Construction Labour Relations Association, whose president is Terry French